WAF, or waf, may refer to:

Computing
Waf, a software build system written in the Python programming language
Web application firewall, a proxy device with protocol awareness of HTTP
Web application framework, a software framework that is designed to support the development of dynamic websites, Web applications and Web services

Culture
World Architecture Festival, an annual festival and awards ceremony for architecture
"Wabash Always Fights," the rallying cheer of Wabash College

Organisations
Welsh Automotive Forum, a company that lobbies the UK government on behalf of the automotive industry in Wales 
Women in the Air Force (WAF), organized in 1948 and active until 1976
Workers Autonomous Federation, one of several underground trade unions in the People's Republic of China
World Archery Federation, a governing sports body
World Apostolate of Fátima, a Roman Catholic movement to promote a faith according to the apparitions at Fátima
World Armwrestling Federation, a federation of arm wrestling associations which organises world championships
Wydad de Fès (Wydad Athletic de Fès), a Moroccan association football club

Science and technology
WAF1, a protein implicated in p53 transcriptional regulation
Weather and Forecasting, an American Meteorological Society journal
Width across flats, the distance between the two flats of a wrench (UK: spanner) or socket 
Wife acceptance factor (or wife approval factor or wife appeal factor), a colloquialism used in discussions related to hi-fi and home theater equipment, home automation

Transport
Wah Fu station, a proposed MTR station in Hong Kong (MTR station code)
Wallyford railway station, East Lothian, Scotland (National Rail station code)

Other 
'With all faults', a phrase used as a disclaimer of any implied warranty of merchantability (often appears in descriptions of second-hand books, cars, knowledge, etc.)